Broadford may refer to:

Places
Broadford, Victoria, Australia
Broadford, County Clare, Republic of Ireland
Broadford, County Limerick, Republic of Ireland
Broadford, Skye, Scotland
Broadford, Pennsylvania, United States
Broadford, Virginia, United States
Shire of Broadford, a former local government area of Victoria, Australia

Other
Broadford Airfield on the Isle of Skye, Scotland
Broadford Football Club, an Australian Rules Football club in Victoria, Australia
Broadford GAA, Gaelic Athletic Association club in County Kildare, Ireland
Broadford railway station, Victoria, Australia
Broadford Track, a motorcycle racing venue in Victoria, Australia